Catcott is a rural village and civil parish, situated close to Edington  to the east of Bridgwater on the Somerset Levels to the north of the Polden Hills in the Sedgemoor district of Somerset, England.

History

In the Domesday Book of 1086 Roger de Courcelles held five hides at Catcott, which were recorded with Glastonbury Abbey's Shapwick estate.

In 1990 Catcott was the winner of the village category of the Britain in Bloom competition.

Governance

The parish council has responsibility for local issues, including setting an annual precept (local rate) to cover the council’s operating costs and producing annual accounts for public scrutiny. The parish council evaluates local planning applications and works with the local police, district council officers, and neighbourhood watch groups on matters of crime, security, and traffic. The parish council's role also includes initiating projects for the maintenance and repair of parish facilities, as well as consulting with the district council on the maintenance, repair, and improvement of highways, drainage, footpaths, public transport, and street cleaning. Conservation matters (including trees and listed buildings) and environmental issues are also the responsibility of the council.

The village falls within the Non-metropolitan district of Sedgemoor, which was formed on 1 April 1974 under the Local Government Act 1972, having previously been part of Bridgwater Rural District, which is responsible for local planning and building control, local roads, council housing, environmental health, markets and fairs, refuse collection and recycling, cemeteries and crematoria, leisure services, parks, and tourism.

Somerset County Council is responsible for running the largest and most expensive local services such as education, social services, libraries, main roads, public transport, policing and fire services, trading standards, waste disposal and strategic planning.

It is also part of the Bridgwater and West Somerset county constituency represented in the House of Commons of the Parliament of the United Kingdom. It elects one Member of Parliament (MP) by the first past the post system of election, and was part of the South West England constituency of the European Parliament prior to Britain leaving the European Union in January 2020, which elected seven MEPs using the d'Hondt method of party-list proportional representation.

Education

Catcott primary school opened in 1842 and the original building is still in use, with further buildings being constructed in the 1970s and in 2000.

Transport
The nearest station was Edington Burtle on the Highbridge Branch of the Somerset and Dorset Joint Railway.

Sites of Special Scientific Interest

Catcott, Edington and Chilton Moors SSSI is a  biological Site of Special Scientific Interest consisting of land south of the River Brue managed by Somerset Wildlife Trust and is known for the variety of the bird life. The site consists of low-lying land south of the River Brue, which floods on a regular basis; land north is included in the Tealham and Tadham Moors SSSI. The site is managed by Somerset Wildlife Trust and includes the Catcott Lows National Nature Reserve, of grassland in the summer, but flood during the winter, creating a perfect habitat for wintering waterfowl and Bewick's swans, Roe deer and several invertebrate species of scientific interest also inhabit the area, Catcott Heath and Catcott North.

Religious sites

The Anglican parish Church of St Peter dates predominantly from the 15th century, but still includes some minor 13th century work, and has been designated as a Grade I listed building. It was formerly one of the Polden Chapels held under Moorlinch, it was adjudged in 1548 to have been a chantry chapel and thus liable to closure and sale by Edward VI's commissioners. It was bought by William Coke, who already held the tithes. He armed himself to keep out the parishioners until 1552 when he demolished it. Following a series of court cases he was forced to rebuild it.

References

External links

Villages in Sedgemoor
Somerset Levels
Civil parishes in Somerset